This is a list of personal computer games (video games for personal computers, including those running Windows, macOS, and Linux) that have sold or shipped at least one million copies. If a game was released on multiple platforms, the sales figures list are only for PC sales. This list is not comprehensive because sales figures are not always publicly available.

Subscription figures for massively multiplayer online games such as Flight Simulator or Lineage and number of accounts from free-to-play games such as Hearthstone are not taken into account as they do not necessarily correspond to sales. For those, see the list of most-played video games by player count.

List

See also
 List of PC games
 List of best-selling video games

Notes

References

PC
Best-selling